Jai Hind is a 2019 Indian, Bhojpuri language action romantic drama film directed by Firoj and jointly produced by Abhay Sinha, Prashant Jammuwala, Aparna Shah, Prashant Gurnani and Sameer Aftab with co-produced by Madz Movies and Padam Singh. It stars Pawan Singh and Madhu Sharma in the lead roles, while Aakanksha Awasthi, Priyanka Pandit, Mir Sarwar, Sanjay Pandey, Apurv Ratan, Brijesh Tripathi, Anoop Arora, Pervez Malik, Anita Sahgal, Mehnaaz Shroff and Sanjay Verma in supporting roles. One of producer of this film Sameer Aftab make a friendly appearance and "Luliya Mangele" fame Nidhi Jha make a special appearance in this film.

Cast
Pawan Singh
Madhu Sharma
Mir Sarwar
Sanjay Pandey
Aakanksha Awasthi
Priyanka Pandit
Apurv Ratan
Brijesh Tripathi
Anoop Arora
Anita Sahgal
Mehnaaz Shroff
Sanjay Verma
Pervez Malik

Production
The film is written and directed by Firoj Khan and jointly produced by Abhay Sinha, Prashant Jammuwala, Aparna Shah, Prashant Gurnani and Sameer Aftab with co-produced by Madz Movies and Padam Singh. The cinematography has been done by Vasu while choreography is by Kanu Mukerjee, Sanjay Korve and Beni Narula. Gurjent Singh is the editor and Promo editing done by Sanjay Jaiswal. Background music scored by Aslam Surti . Prashant Nishant and Shashikant Singh is the presenters of the film.

Music
Music of "Jai Hind" is composed by Chhote Baba and guestly composed by Aman Shlok, Govind Ojha and Pankaj Tiwari with lyrics penned by Rajesh Mishra, Pankaj Tiwari, Govind Ojha, Vivek Bakshi, Sumit Chandravanshi and Shekhar Madhur. Background music scored by Aslam Surti. It is produced under the "Yashi Films", who also bought his satellite rights.

Marketing
Trailer of this film is released on 25 July 2019 at official YouTube handle of "Yashi Films" Owned by film producer Abhay Sinha. Trailer is crossed over 1 million views till now.

The film was released on 9 August 2019 at all theatres of Uttar Pradesh, Bihar and Jharkhand. The film is make a record of highest opening at Anand Mandir Cinema,  Varanasi and break record of "Border" starring by Dinesh Lal Yadav.

References

2010s Bhojpuri-language films